Matthew Shaw Viney (born 28 July 1954, in Melbourne, Victoria), is a Labor Party politician, and a former member of the Victorian Legislative Council for the Eastern Victoria Region.

Viney was first elected to the Frankston East electorate during the 1999 Frankston East By-election, which was one of the factors in Steve Bracks winning a minority government. Frankston East was abolished in the following election and Viney was elected to Chelsea Province in the 2002 Victorian state elections. In 2006 Victorian state elections, Viney was elected to the Eastern Victoria Region.

Viney is a supporter of the Collingwood Magpies and in 2008 was also chosen to head the 2008 Victorian Spirit of ANZAC Prize.

References

1954 births
Living people
Politicians from Melbourne
Members of the Victorian Legislative Assembly
Members of the Victorian Legislative Council
Australian Labor Party members of the Parliament of Victoria
21st-century Australian politicians